Fernanda Erlanger Rodrigues (born 21 October 1979) is a Brazilian actress and television presenter.

Career 
Fernanda Rodrigues began her career as a child, with only three years old have participated in music videos and advertisements. At age 11, debuted as an actress on the soap opera Vamp playing Isa. Since then participated in numerous productions of Rede Globo, among them: Deus nos Acuda, A Viagem, Malhação, Zazá, Corpo Dourado, Vila Madalena, Estrela-Guia, Sabor da Paixão, O Profeta, in addition to historical miniseries Aquarela do Brasil.

In film, she appeared in Simão, o Fantasma Trapalhão, A Partilha, De Morango, and starred in the movie Noite de São João.

She acted in plays like assembling Pollyana, A.m.i.g.a.s. and Beijo no Asfalto. Since 2006, alongside Bruno Mazzeo, protagonist of the Enfim Nós, a romantic comedy. Recently played on the soap opera of Negócio da China Stelinha the Gothic, the first villain in her career.

In 2011, she was applauded by audiences and critics with the character in the novel Jose O Astro, showing every emotion in the skin of a young woman who gives his life for the child. Six days in October, date of death of Joseph in the novel, her character's name appeared on the TT site twitter Brazil, Brazilian recognition of his brilliant performance.

2015 marks the return of Fernanda to the novels in Sete Vidas and launches a new challenge for the actress: to present a program on the GNT channel, Fazendo a Festa, in which each episode the artist together with a team of professionals Make a children's birthday party idealized from the idea of the birthday girl.

Personal life 
Rodrigues is married to actor Raoni Carneiro and they have a daughter, Luísa (born on December 11, 2009), and a son, Bento (born on February 11, 2016).

It was Sandy's maid of honor with the musician Lucas Lima of the Família Lima. They've been best friends since meeting while working together in Estrela Guia. She is the godmother of Cauet, the son of actress Susana Werner with goalkeeper Júlio César.

She and her husband chose people close to them to be godparents of their children. The actor Paulo Vilhena is godfather of Luísa and the actor Ricardo Pereira and his wife Francisca are the godfathers of Bento.

Filmography

Television

Films
 Simão O Fantasma Trapalhão (1998) - Virgínia
 A Partilha (2001) - Simone
 Noite de São João (2003) - Júlia
 De Morango (2003) - Mum
 Vestido pra Casar (2014) - Nara

References

External links
 

1979 births
Living people
Actresses from Rio de Janeiro (city)
Brazilian telenovela actresses
Brazilian film actresses
Brazilian stage actresses
Brazilian people of German descent